Ye Mengde (1077–1148) was a Song dynasty Chinese scholar, poet, and government minister.

References 

1077 births
1148 deaths
Song dynasty classicists